Durban Airport can refer to one of two airports:

 King Shaka International Airport , the primary airport serving the Durban area
 Durban International Airport (formerly Louis Botha Airport), the airport serving Durban from 1951 to 2010